Amorbia santamaria is a species of moth of the family Tortricidae. It is found in Costa Rica and Guatemala.

The length of the forewings is 11.5–12.2 mm for males and 13–14 mm for females. The ground colour of the forewings is light brown, but the median fascia is darker brown and the subterminal fascia is dark brown. The hindwings are pale brown to cream, except for a patch of darker scales at the apex.

Etymology
The species name refers to the type locality, Santa María volcano in Guatemala.

References

Moths described in 2007
Sparganothini
Moths of Central America